The Men's shot put at the 2010 Commonwealth Games as part of the athletics programme was held at the Jawaharlal Nehru Stadium on Wednesday 6 October and Thursday 7 October 2010.

Records

Results

Qualifying round
Qualification: Qualifying Performance 19.00 (Q) or at least 12 best performers (q) advance to the Final.

Final

External links
2010 Commonwealth Games - Athletics

Men's shot put
2010